
This is a list of past and present members of the Académie des Beaux-Arts in section IV: Engraving.

Seat #1 

 elected 1803: Charles Clément Balvay (1756–1822)
 1822: Pierre Alexandre Tardieu (1756–1844)
 1844: François Forster (1790–1872)
 1873: Alphonse François (1814–1888)
 1888: Auguste III Blanchard (1819–1898)
 1898: Léopold Flameng (1831–1911)
 1911: Émile-Jean Sulpis (1856–1942)
 1943: Albert Decaris (1901–1988)
 1989:  (1907–1989)
 1991:  (1922–2007)
 2008:  (born 1948)

Seat #2

 1803: Romain-Vincent Jeuffroy (1749–1826)
 1826: Théodore Richomme (1785–1849)
 1849: Louis-Pierre Henriquel-Dupont (1797–1892)
 1892: Achille Jacquet (1846–1908)
 1908: Charles Waltner (1846–1925)
 1925: Jean-Émile Buland (1857–1938)
 1938: André Dauchez (1870–1948)
 1949:  (1905–1977)
 1978: Pierre-Yves Trémois (1921–2020)

Seat #3 

 1803: Rambert Dumarest (1750–1806)
 1806: Pierre-Simon-Benjamin Duvivier (1730–1819)
 1819: André Galle (1761–1844)
 1845: Jacques-Édouard Gatteaux (1788–1881)
 1881: Jules-Clément Chaplain (1839–1909)
 1909: Frédéric-Charles-Victor de Vernon (1858–1912)
 1913: Henri-Auguste Patey (1855–1930)
 1930: Louis-Alexandre Bottée (1852–1940)
 1942: Henri Dropsy (1885–1969)
 1970:  (1907–2002)
 2005:  (1927–2013)
 2016:  (born 1962)

Seat #4 

 1816: Auguste Gaspard Louis Desnoyers (1779–1857)
 1857: Achille-Louis Martinet (1806–1877)
 1878: Gustave Bertinot (1822–1888)
 1888: Oscar Roty (1846–1911)
 1911: Frédéric Laguillermie (1841–1934)
 1935: Henri Le Riche (1868–1944)
 1945: Demetrios Galanis (1882–1966)
 1967:  (1897–1980)
 1981:  (1904–1992)
 1994:  (1925–2016)
 2018:  (born 1956)

Sources
 List of members @ the Académie des Beaux-Arts website.

See also
List of Académie des Beaux-Arts members: Painting
List of Académie des Beaux-Arts members: Sculpture
List of Académie des Beaux-Arts members: Architecture
List of Académie des Beaux-Arts members: Music
List of Académie des Beaux-Arts members: Unattached
List of Académie des Beaux-Arts members: Cinema

 Engraving
French engravers
Lists of French people